The New Jersey Sports and Exposition Authority (NJSEA) is an independent authority established by the State of New Jersey in 1971 to oversee the Meadowlands Sports Complex, but which now contains the New Jersey Meadowlands Commission, a regulatory, planning, and zoning agency, in addition to its original duties.  Originally consisting of Giants Stadium and the Meadowlands Racetrack in 1976, Meadowlands Arena was added to the complex in 1981 and New Meadowlands Stadium (now MetLife Stadium) replaced Giants Stadium in 2010. Its first Chairman and CEO was David A. "Sonny" Werblin. Its present Chairman is Carl Goldberg and its CEO is Vincent Prieto.

Over the years, the NJSEA's purview expanded to include Monmouth Park Racetrack in Oceanport and the Wildwoods Convention Center in Wildwood. In Atlantic City, the Authority oversaw the construction and development of the Convention Center and the renovation of the historic Boardwalk Hall, the long-time home of the Miss America Pageant.

In the 1990s the NJSEA built the New Jersey State Aquarium (now known as the Adventure Aquarium) in Camden. The NJSEA also contributed to the construction of the Meadowlands Environment Center in Lyndhurst, just across Berry's Creek from the Sports Complex.

The 16-member Board of Commissioners is appointed by the Governor to four-year terms, subject to confirmation by the New Jersey Senate and it includes three ex officio members: The Authority President, the State Treasurer and a designated representative of the New Jersey Meadowlands Commission. The Authority holds regularly scheduled meeting which are open to the public. The minutes of all Authority meetings are subject to approval by the Governor. Joe Plumeri, owner of the Trenton Thunder and CEO of Willis Group Holdings, was Commissioner of the New Jersey Sports and Exposition Authority from 1997 to 2004.

The NJSEA facilities are home to the New York Giants and Jets, which also serves as major venues for concerts and family shows.  Since 1976, NJSEA buildings have hosted many major events, including Super Bowl XLVIII, seven games of the 1994 World Cup, the 1996 Men's Final Four, NFL playoff games and Super Bowl championship celebrations, the 2002 and 2003 NBA Finals, the Stanley Cup Finals of 1995, 2000, 2001 and 2003, the 1999 Women’s World Cup, many other international soccer matches - including Pelé's farewell game, a 1995 Papal Mass by Pope John Paul II and countless major concerts.

The Meadowlands Racetrack, a leading standardbred racing and simulcasting facility, is home to harness racing’s prestigious Hambletonian Stakes and hosts a fall thoroughbred meet.

Historic Monmouth Park is the site of a summer thoroughbred meet highlighted by the Haskell Invitational won in dramatic fashion in 2009 by the filly, Rachel Alexandra.

The NJSEA also operates the Off Track Wagering (OTW) facility, Favorites at Woodbridge, and has received approval to open a second OTW in Bayonne.

The NJSEA also provides in-house security, emergency medical services, and fire protection staff to the entire Meadowlands Sports Complex, including MetLife Stadium, the replacement for Giants Stadium at the Meadowlands Sports Complex built privately by the Jets and Giants, as they have done in the past at Giants Stadium.

The NJSEA owns the land beneath the American Dream Meadowlands shopping complex.  It issued $1.15 billion in municipal bonds to support the project.

In February 2018, it was announced that Vincent Prieto, former Speaker of the New Jersey General Assembly would step down from his post and succeed Wayne Hasenbalg as president and chief executive officer, a position that will pay him a $280,000 per year annual salary.

CEOs
Sonny Werblin: 1971–1974
Jack Krumpe: 1974–1978
Robert G. Harter: 1978–1978
Robert Mulcahy: 1978–1998
Dennis R. Robinson: 1998–1999
Wayne Hasenbalg: 1999–2018
Vincent Prieto: 2018–present

References

External links
 New Jersey Sports & Exposition Authority
 Meadowlands Sports Complex
 Monmouth Park Racetrack
 Atlantic City Convention & Visitors Authority

Sports and Exposition Authority
Sports in New Jersey
Government agencies established in 1971
1971 establishments in New Jersey